The following table is a list of the 31 federal states of Mexico plus Mexico City, ranked in order of their total population based on data from the last three National Population Census in 2020, 2010 and 2000.

See also
 Mexico
 States of Mexico
 Geography of Mexico
 List of Mexican states by area
 List of Mexican states by population growth rate
 Ranked list of Mexican states
 List of Mexican states by HDI

References

Population
Mexico, population